Martha Sharp Joukowsky (2 September 1936 - 7 January 2022) was a Near Eastern archaeologist and a retired member of the faculty of Brown University known for her fieldwork at the ancient site of Petra in Jordan.

Early life and education
Martha Sharp Joukowsky was the daughter of Waitstill Hastings Sharp and Martha Ingham Dickie, noted for aiding Jews escaping Nazi persecution in Czechoslovakia during World War II. Joukowsky was educated at Pembroke College (B.A. 1958) American University of Beirut (MA 1972) and Paris I-Sorbonne (Ph.D. 1982).

Academic career
From 1982 to 2002 Joukowsky was Professor in the Center for Old World Archaeology and Art and the Department of Anthropology at Brown University. Her archaeological fieldwork has included  work in Lebanon (1967-1972), Hong Kong (1972-1973), Turkey (1975-1986), Italy (1982-1985), and Greece (1987-1990). Joukowsky conducted archaeological fieldwork at Petra for more than ten years, beginning in 1992. Her work, and that of Brown University, focused on Petra's so-called "Great Temple" during that time.

Martha Sharp Joukowsky was also elected as President (1989-1993) of the Archaeological Institute of America and was Trustee for the American University of Beirut, Lebanon. She also serves as Trustee Emerita of Brown University.

Personal life
Artemis A. W. Joukowsky, her husband, was chancellor of Brown University (1997–98) and together they created the Artemis A.W. and Martha Sharp Joukowsky Institute for Archaeology and the Ancient World at Brown University in 2004; the institute was first directed by Susan Alcock, who was succeeded in the post by Peter van Dommelen.

Honours
In 1993 Joukowsky endowed an annual lecture series in her own name for the  Archaeological Institute of America.

She accepted the Yad Vashem award on behalf of her parents in 2006.

Selected publications
1980. A complete manual of field archaeology: tools and techniques of field work for archaeologists. Englewood Cliffs (NJ): Prentice-Hall.
1988. The young archaeologist in the oldest port city in the world. Beirut: Dar el-Machreq.
1996a. Early Turkey: an introduction to the archaeology of Anatolia from prehistory through the Lydian period. Dubuque (IA): Kendall/Hunt Publishing Co.
1996b. Prehistoric Aphrodisias: an account of the excavations and artifact studies. Providence (RI): Brown University, Center for Old World Archaeology and Art.
1998. Petra Great Temple: Brown University excavations, 1993-1997. Providence (RI): Brown University Petra Exploration Fund.
Cohen, G. & M.S. Joukowsky. (ed.) 2004. Breaking ground: pioneering women archaeologists. Ann Arbor: University of Michigan Press.
2007. Petra Great Temple, Volume II: archaeological contexts of the remains and excavations. Providence (RI): Brown University Petra Exploration Fund.

References

External links 
 Petra Great Temple Excavations
 Joukowsky Family Foundation

1936 births
Living people
People from Montague, Massachusetts
Archaeologists of the Near East
Brown University faculty
20th-century American archaeologists
American women archaeologists
20th-century women writers
20th-century American women
American women academics
21st-century American women
Pembroke College in Brown University alumni